Portsmouth Football Club is a professional association football club based in Portsmouth, Hampshire, England, which compete in . They are also known as Pompey, a local nickname used by both His Majesty's Naval Base, Portsmouth and the city of Portsmouth. The club was founded on 5 April 1898 by Sir John Brickwood and began playing home matches at Fratton Park in 1899. Portsmouth are one of only five English football clubs to have been champions of all four tiers of the professional English football pyramid. Portsmouth's arch-rivals are Southampton, a rivalry based in part to geographic proximity and both cities' respective maritime histories.

Portsmouth began their early history in the Southern and Western leagues, winning five division titles before being elected into the English Football League in 1920 as founder members of the Third Division. They won the Third Division South title in 1922–23 and were promoted out of the Second Division at the end of the 1926–27 season, becoming the first southern club outside of London to reach the top tier of English professional football. They competed in the 1929, 1934 and 1939 FA Cup finals, winning the competition for the first time in latter of these finals and thereby remaining as reigning champions throughout World War II for seven years. Portsmouth won the First Division title in 1948–49 and 1949–50 under the stewardship of Bob Jackson. However, their 32 consecutive years in the top-flight ended in relegation in 1959 and was followed by another relegation two years later, though the goals of Ron Saunders helped the club to win promotion as Third Division champions in 1961–62.

The Fourth Division was created in 1958 and Portsmouth were relegated to the fourth tier for the first time in 1978, their second relegation in three years, though promotion out of the Fourth Division was secured in 1979–80 and was followed by another Third Division title in 1982–83. Promotion back to the top-flight was achieved in 1986–87, though they stayed there for just one season and then remained in the second tier between 1988 and winning the division in 2002–03. They spent seven seasons in the Premier League and lifted the FA Cup again under manager Harry Redknapp in 2008. They lost the 2010 FA Cup final after being relegated, which signalled the start of a difficult period where the club entered financial administration twice and were relegated three times, dropping down to the fourth tier in 2013. Portsmouth were saved from High Court liquidation after being bought out by the fan-owned Pompey Supporters Trust (PST) in April 2013. PST sold the club on to Michael Eisner after the League Two title was won at the end of the 2016–17 campaign. Portsmouth went on to win the EFL Trophy in 2019.

History

Other early Portsmouth clubs

 1871–1896 – Portsmouth A.F.C. – Amateur club formed by Portsmouth architect Arthur Cogswell. Sir Arthur Conan Doyle played as a goalkeeper under the pseudonym, "A.C. Smith".
 ?–1891–?? – Portsmouth Town F.C. – An amateur team who almost became Portsmouth's first professional club, but whose efforts failed and led to their disbandment.
 1894–1899 – Royal Artillery (Portsmouth) F.C. (reformed 1900–1901) – A popular British Army regiment amateur football team based at the United Services Recreation Ground complex at Burnaby Road, Portsmouth.  The club joined the Football Association in 1896 and joined the Southern Football League in 1897.   "The Gunners" reached the FA Amateur Cup final in 1899, but opponents Harwich & Parkeston F.C. protested that the club had spent a week training for the semi-final match at Aldeburgh, at the expense of the club, which fell outside the FA's strict limitations on amateur expenditure.  The FA upheld the protest and disqualified the club; although the R.A. protested, the protest was dismissed. With the first choice players effectively disbarred, the R.A. was forced to field reserves for the last few League matches, and after finishing bottom of the Southern League First Division, was relegated after losing a test match to Cowes F.C..   Their supporters were the originators of the "Town Hall Chimes" (later known as, "The Pompey Chimes") and the team were nicknamed "Pompey" before the professional Portsmouth F.C. were formed in 1898.    The demise of the club in 1899 led to a rise in interest of Portsmouth F.C.. Royal Artillery (Portsmouth) F.C. briefly reformed for one more season in 1900–1901.

1898–1899: Founding of Portsmouth F.C.

Contrary to popular belief and urban myth, Portsmouth F.C. were not deliberately formed to replace Royal Artillery (Portsmouth) F.C. The club had already been formed in 1898 before Royal Artillery's 1899 "professionalism" scandal which led to RA's disbandment.

By luck or coincidence, Portsmouth F.C. had been formed earlier on 5 April 1898, at 12 High Street, Old Portsmouth, (the office of solicitor John Edward Pink) as "The Portsmouth Football and Athletic Company", with John Brickwood as chairman, The company directors were:
 John Brickwood (1852–1932) (owner of Brickwoods Brewery, Portsmouth. Knighted by King Edward VII in 1904. In 1927, he became Sir John Brickwood, 1st Baronet Brickwood of Portsmouth.)
 Alfred H. Bone (a local architect and surveyor)
 George Lewin Oliver (?–1934) (Founder and headmaster of 'Mile End House School', a boys preparatory school, known informally as 'Oliver's Academy')
 John Wyatt Peters (a wine importer)
 John Edward Pink (1866-1939) (a solicitor based at 12 High Street, Old Portsmouth) (b. 6 June 1866, d. 21 March 1939. Became Mayor of Portsmouth 1904–1905)
 William Wigginton (1843-?) (a government contractor and former Royal Engineers Warrant Officer, Foreman of Works, Royal Engineer Department)

A Blue Plaque on the wall of 12 High Street, Old Portsmouth (Alderman John E. Pink's solicitors' office building) commemorates the founding on 5 April 1898.

1899–1920: Southern Football League and Western Football League (1900–1909)
Although the founding of Portsmouth F.C. had been agreed on 5 April 1898, a football ground or a team of players did not exist until 1899.

In 1899, work began on developing a plot of former agricultural land near Goldsmith Avenue, Milton, Portsmouth into a new football ground, bought in 1898 from the local Goldsmith farming family. The new football ground was to be named Fratton Park after the nearby and convenient Fratton railway station, with an adjoining railway goods yard located between the two.

Frank Brettell was announced as Portsmouth Football Club's first manager-secretary in February 1899, he had been secretary-player with the St Domingo F.C. (now Everton) in Liverpool and helped "create the organisation which became Everton". Brettell joined Portsmouth F.C. in May 1899 and his first Portsmouth signings were Irish goalkeeper Matt Reilly and Harry Turner both from the recently "retired" Royal Artillery (Portsmouth) F.C. Also joining Portsmouth as a new director was Regimental Sergeant-Major Frederick Windrum, the treasurer-trainer from Royal Artillery.

Brettell, with his valuable northern contacts, also signed Scottish footballer Tom Wilkie, the former Heart Of Midlothian and Liverpool player. Bob Blyth and Alex "Sandy" Brown were both signed from Preston North End. Edward Turner, Harold Clarke and Harold Stringfellow all came from Everton. Dan Cunliffe, Thomas "Tommy" Cleghorn and Robert "Bobby" Marshall were all signed from Liverpool.

A bold and ambitious application for Portsmouth's direct entry into the Southern League First Division, without the usual probationary period in the lower divisions, was accepted, and the club joined the Southern Football League Division One for the 1899–1900 season. The Southern League were very keen to see a professional team from Portsmouth join the Southern League, the Southern League secretary, Mr Nat Whittaker was quoted in the press as saying; "Personally, I think there is a great future for 'socker'(sic) generally in Portsmouth and if they can only do well next season the success of the club is assured. Help them? Of course, I will, and anyone else who wants to make football grow in the south". Whittaker also said he was confident that Portsmouth would be elected into the league by the other clubs at the next general meeting of the Southern League, which they were.

Portsmouth's first competitive Southern League match was played away at Chatham Town at Maidstone Road, Chatham on Saturday 2 September 1899, which Portsmouth won  1–0, with Portsmouth's first-ever goal scored by Harold Clarke. During the match, Portsmouth manager Frank Brettel had sent telegrams of the latest score every fifteen minutes to Fratton Park, where crowds had gathered to hear the latest news. Four days later, on Wednesday 6 September 1899, the first-ever home match at Fratton Park was played; a friendly against local town rivals Southampton, which Portsmouth won 2–0, with goals from Dan Cunliffe and Harold Clarke. Portsmouth's first competitive Southern League home match followed on Saturday 9 September, a 2–0 win against Reading, with goals again scored by Clarke and Cunliffe, attended by a crowd of up to 7000 supporters. Portsmouth's first 1899–1900 season in the Southern Football League Division One was successful, with the club winning 20 out of 28 league matches, earning them the runner-up spot in the table behind champions, Tottenham Hotspur.

In their second 1900–01 Southern Football League Division One season, Portsmouth finished in third place behind second place Bristol City and first place Southampton. Portsmouth also joined the 1900–01 Western Football League and finished top as Division One champions. The following season saw Portsmouth player Bob Blyth become Portsmouth's second manager on 1 August 1901, replacing Frank Brettell who had left on 31 May 1901. Portsmouth won the 1901–02 Southern Football League championship title. However, Portsmouth were not promoted and no teams were relegated. No clubs had applied for election to the Football League proper. In the 1901–02 Western Football League, Portsmouth also won the Division One championship for a second consecutive season.

In the 1902–03 Southern Football League, Portsmouth finished in third place. In the 1902–03 Western Football League, Portsmouth won the Division One championship for a third consecutive season.

The following 1903–04 Southern Football League saw a fourth-place finish. On 5 July 1904, Portsmouth F.C. Chairman and Brickwoods Brewery owner, Sir John Brickwood was Knighted by His Majesty, King Edward VII. In the 1903–04 Western Football League, Portsmouth finished in fourth position behind champions Tottenham Hotspur.

Richard Bonney, the ex-army soldier who had co-founded Royal Artillery (Portsmouth) F.C. in 1894, became Portsmouth's third manager on 1 August 1905 for the 1905–06 Southern Football League. Portsmouth finished in third place. In the 1905–06 Western Football League, Portsmouth finished in seventh position behind champions Queens Park Rangers. A new club pavilion was designed and built by Arthur Cogswell in the south-west corner of Fratton Park, which housed the club offices and player's changing rooms. John Brickwood also donated a clock tower spire to the east side of the new pavilion.

In the 1906–07 Southern Football League, Portsmouth ended the season as runners-up for a second time, after Fulham won the title by just two points. Meanwhile, in the 1906–07 Western Football League, the top Division One was split into equal 'A' and 'B' sections, with a playoff between the two section winners to decide a Division One champion. Portsmouth finished in third position in the 'B' section of Division One. The 1906–07 season was highlighted by the visit of Manchester United to Fratton Park in the FA Cup, which generated a record attendance of 24,329. A 2–2 draw meant a replay in Manchester, where Portsmouth recorded a famous 2–1 win.

The next 1908–09 season, Portsmouth finished in fourth position. In their last Western Football League appearance, Portsmouth finished in fourth position of the 'B' section of Division One. At the end of the season, all fourteen members of the split 'A' and 'B' sections of Division One resigned from the Western Football League.

For the 1909–10 Southern Football League, Portsmouth abandoned their salmon pink and maroon "Shrimps" era shirts and changed their colours to white shirts, navy blue shorts and navy blue socks. Portsmouth ended their season in sixth place before the following season saw the team win only 8 of their 38 games and were relegated. Manager Richard Bonney was then let go. A severe financial crisis struck between seasons and a public appeal for funds in May 1911 kept the club afloat.

1912: Reformation
With the recruitment of Robert Brown from Sheffield Wednesday, as Portsmouth's fourth manager, the team finished second place in the 1911–12 Southern Football League Division Two behind Merthyr Town and were promoted as runners-up. However, the club's finances were in trouble again, with losses and debts increasing to £10,000. A shareholders meeting was called on 8 May 1912, where George Lewin Oliver, one of the original founders and directors, proposed that "The Portsmouth Football and Athletic Company" should be wound up and replaced with a more business orientated company. The original company was then liquidated to remove the debt and on 27 July 1912, the "Portsmouth Football Company Ltd" was formed as the new parent company of Portsmouth F.C., with substantial financial guarantees given by the board of directors. The original 1898 founding director George Lewin Oliver became the new Portsmouth F.C. chairman.

For the new 1912–13 Southern Football League season back in Division One, Portsmouth, now under new ownership, wore new home colours of blue shirts, white shorts and black stockings. Portsmouth finished the season in 11th position.

Portsmouth's famous crest, consisting of a crescent moon and star made its first appearance in the 1913–14 season. The moon and star motif comes from the Portsmouth town (then) coat of arms and are believed to date back as far as the time of Richard I. Curiously, the star on the original badge featured a star with five points rather than the eight that appear on the town crest. Portsmouth ended the season in 9th position.

Football was suspended during the 1914–1918 First World War. Many with connections to Portsmouth F.C. joined the "Pompey Pals Battalions", which formed parts of the Hampshire Regiment. Many never returned home. In 1915, the Fratton End terrace was upgraded to accommodate 8,000 standing supporters and covered with a roof for the first time.

On 24 April 1916, an Easter Monday, two charity fund-raising matches between Portsmouth FC and Southampton FC both simultaneously took place at both Fratton Park and Southampton's The Dell. The Fratton Park game was won by Portsmouth 7-0; the other match at The Dell was won by Portsmouth 2-3.

On 6 June 1918, an American army team played a Canadian army team in a baseball match at Fratton Park, with the gate money donated to the British Red Cross. The US army team won 4–3.

Following the resumption of matches in the 1919–20 season, Portsmouth won the Southern League championship for the second time. Portsmouth were then elected to the Football League Third Division as founder members. John McCartney took over as the fifth manager of Portsmouth on 1 May 1920 from Robert Brown who had left to join Gillingham, also in The Football League.

1920–1939: The Football League
Competing in the inaugural season in England's Football League Third Division, Portsmouth claimed the title only four years later in the 1923–24 season with the team being promoted into the Second Division. Debuting in the second division for the first time, they finished in fourth place behind Derby County, Manchester United and the division champions, Leicester City. The following season , a new South Stand was designed by renowned football architect Archibald Leitch and was opened by Football League President John McKenna on 29 August 1925, just before the kickoff against Middlesbrough. The season ended with Portsmouth in eleventh position.

After finishing in eleventh position, Portsmouth won promotion to the first Division by finishing runners-up in the 1926–27 Second Division season and in the process, getting their biggest club win with a 9–1 home win over Notts County, which is still the highest home win scoring record to date. Portsmouth's promotion to the top division in English football was a double celebration; the first achieved by a football club based south of London, and the first achieved by a club graduating from the Third Division to the First Division.

Sunderland A.F.C. fan and South Shields manager Jack Tinn joined Portsmouth as new manager on 1 May 1927, replacing John McCartney who had resigned due to ill health. Portsmouth's debut season in the 1927–28 First Division was a struggle, finishing one point and one place above relegation.

The next 1928–29 season in the First Division, Portsmouth continued to falter, losing 10–0 away at Filbert Street to Leicester City, which is still a club record away defeat. Despite their failings in the Football League, however, that season also saw Portsmouth reach the FA Cup Final for the first time, which they lost to Bolton Wanderers. One Pompey supporter is reported to have "carried a black cat, with the club colours around its neck" to the 1929 FA Cup Final. Portsmouth managed to survive relegation, finishing one place above relegation.

From 1929 to 1934, Portsmouth had become a regular top-half table finisher in the First Division. The 1933–34 season saw Portsmouth again reach the FA Cup final for a second time, having beaten Manchester United, Bolton Wanderers, Leicester City and Birmingham City on the way. The club was again defeated in the FA Cup Final, this time by Manchester City.

Halfway through the 1934–35 season, on 23 December 1934, the original 1898 founding director and later Portsmouth chairman, George Lewin Oliver died. Using money from the June 1934 sale of defender Jimmy Allen and money from the 1934 FA Cup Final, Portsmouth F.C. announced at Christmas 1934 that Fratton Park's North Stand was to be demolished and replaced with a much larger stand, increasing the ground capacity to more than 58,000. The 1934–35 season ended with Portsmouth in fourteenth position and seven points above relegation.

On 7 September at the beginning of the 1935–36 First Division season, in a home game against Aston Villa, the new North Stand was opened by John McKenna, who had also opened Fratton Park's new South Stand ten years earlier. Former Portsmouth defender Jimmy Allen, whose sale in 1934 had largely paid for the new North Stand, was present at the game, as captain of the visiting Aston Villa team. The new North Stand briefly held the nickname of "The Jimmy Allen Stand" for a while afterwards. Portsmouth ended the 1935–36 season in tenth place.

1938–39 season: First FA Cup triumph
Having established themselves in the top flight, the 1938–39 season saw Portsmouth reach the FA Cup Final for the third time with manager Jack Tinn, who had worn his 'lucky' spats throughout the qualifying rounds. This was indeed third time lucky, as Portsmouth managed to defeat favourites Wolverhampton Wanderers 4–1 in what the press had dubbed, 'The Gland Final' – a reference to 'monkey gland' testosterone injections – used by both teams (and others) that season. Bert Barlow and John 'Jock' Anderson scored, whilst Cliff Parker scored twice (third and fourth goals).

The new 1939–40 season in the First Division began on Saturday 26 August 1939.  On Friday 1 September 1939, Germany invaded Poland. On Saturday 2 September 1939, all divisions of the Football League played their third and final game of the season, with Blackpool F.C. at the top of the table and Portsmouth in 18th position. These would be the last national Football League fixtures before abandonment following the British declaration of war on Germany on Sunday 3 September 1939. Large gatherings of crowds were suspended with the implementation of the Emergency Powers (Defence) Act 1939.

However, football competitions did take place during the war, with the Football League being split into ten regional mini leagues, with Portsmouth in 'League South'. An annual national cup competition was held too, called the Football League War Cup.

In 1942, Portsmouth reached the London War Cup final, a competition that had begun only a season earlier in 1940–41. The London War Cup was held once again during the 1941–42 season and was intended by its organisers to stand in for the FA Cup, despite the official Football League War Cup competition had been taking place annually since 1939.  The London War Cup competition required Portsmouth, the current FA Cup champions, to secede from the Football Association to enter. Portsmouth progressed to the 1942 London War Cup final at Wembley Stadium, but were beaten by Brentford and finished as runners-up. After the competition, Portsmouth paid a ten Pounds readmission fee to rejoin the Football Association again. The London War Cup competition was never played again. Ironically, the London War Cup trophy won by Brentford in 1942 was reused for subsequent Football League War Cup competitions. The trophy was last presented in 1945 to Chelsea and remains in the Chelsea F.C. museum today.

During his wartime visits to Portsmouth, Field Marshal Montgomery became interested in Portsmouth Football Club and was made honorary President of Portsmouth F.C. in 1944 (until 1961).

The end of World War II in 1945 caused Portsmouth to hold the distinction of holding the FA Cup trophy for the longest uninterrupted period of seven years, as the trophy was not presented again until the 1946 FA Cup Final. Manager Jack Tinn was rumoured to have kept the FA Cup trophy 'safe under his bed' during a part of the war. Because the navy city of Portsmouth was a primary strategic military target for German Luftwaffe bombing, the FA Cup trophy was routinely moved around the city of Portsmouth for its safety and protection, moving from Fratton Park's boardroom, into bank vaults, back to Fratton Park and around local pubs. During the worst of the bombing on Portsmouth, the FA Cup trophy was also taken ten miles north of Portsmouth, to the nearby Hampshire village of Lovedean, where it was kept and displayed in a quaint thatched roof country pub called "The Bird in Hand". In 1945, the FA Cup trophy was taken around the streets of Portsmouth and proudly shown off at Victory in Europe Day street parties.

FA Cup competition was resumed for the 1945–46 season, but the resumption of the Football League had to wait one more year. Portsmouth, as a Division One team and as the current FA Cup Champions (from 1939), were drawn to play against Birmingham City in the Third Round stage of the FA Cup competition. The first of the two-leg tie was played at Birmingham's St. Andrew's stadium on 5 January 1946 and the result was 1–0 in Birmingham City's favour. The second leg at Fratton Park ended 0–0 on 9 January 1946, with Birmingham City winning 1–0 overall on aggregate. (See 1945–46 FA Cup for full results) The FA Cup trophy was not to stay with Portsmouth for an eighth consecutive year and was returned to the Football Association in time for the 1946 FA Cup Final, in which Derby County were awarded the trophy.

The Football League finally resumed in 1946–47. Portsmouth had capitalised on the footballers called up to serve in the Royal Navy and Royal Marines in the war years and recruited some of them. In this way, Portsmouth had the pick of some of the best. Portsmouth ended the 1946–47 Football League First Division season in 12th place. On 1 May 1947, legendary manager Jack Tinn left Portsmouth, with Bob Jackson taking over the role on the same day.

The second post-war Football League First Division season resumed under manager Bob Jackson in 1947–48. This was also the first season Portsmouth wore red socks, which replaced their traditional black socks. The red socks were an idea proposed by Portsmouth's honorary president, Field Marshal Montgomery, who had suggested that Portsmouth should wear red socks to commemorate the sacrifice of British servicemen lost in war. Red is traditionally the colour of the British Army and also of the Remembrance poppy flower, and so Montgomery's idea was adopted by Portsmouth at the start of the season. Bob Jackson's Portsmouth finished in 8th place at the end of the 1947–48 First Division season.

1948–49 and 1949–50: Champions of England
In their 50-year "Golden Jubilee" anniversary 1948–49 season, Bob Jackson's Portsmouth side were tipped to be the first team of the 20th century to win a historic Football League and FA Cup "double".  The potential of a rare 'Double' saw Fratton Park attracting average home attendances of 36,000 supporters, and a record attendance of 51,385 in an FA Cup quarter-final match against Derby County on 26 February 1949, which Portsmouth won 2–1. Portsmouth lost 1–3 in the FA Cup semi-final against Leicester City on 26 March 1949 at the neutral Highbury stadium. Portsmouth however, did win one half of the 'Double', securing the First Division title and becoming Football League Champions of England at the end of the 1948–49 season, with Manchester United finishing as runners-up. Portsmouth's championship-winning team consisted of Ernest Butler, Phil Rookes, Bill Spence, Harry Ferrier, Jimmy Scoular, Reg Flewin, Jimmy Dickinson, Peter Harris, Duggie Reid, Ike Clarke, Len Phillips, Jack Froggatt, Jasper Yeuell, Lindy Delapenha, Bert Barlow and Cliff Parker.

Bob Jackson's Portsmouth side beat Aston Villa 5–1 on the last day of the following 1949–50 season, winning the Football League title again for a second consecutive season – on goal average – as both Portsmouth and runners up Wolverhampton Wanderers finished the season with 53 points each, and only one point ahead of third place Sunderland on 52 points. Portsmouth are one of only five English teams to have won back-to-back consecutive top-flight League titles since the end of World War II.

In the following 1950–51 season, League champions Portsmouth finished in 7th position, 13 points behind title winners Tottenham Hotspur.

Eddie Lever took over at Pompey in 1952 after championship-winning manager Bob Jackson joined Hull City. In the 1952–53 season, Portsmouth finished in 15th place and only 4 points above the relegation zone, with Arsenal F.C. winning the league title.

Portsmouth finished third in the 1954–55 season, only 4 points behind winners Chelsea F.C.

In the 1955–56 season, on 22 February 1956, Fratton Park hosted the Football League's first ever floodlit evening game, against Newcastle United, played under floodlights erected on top of the North Stand and South Stand roofs. Portsmouth ended the season in 12th place in Division One.

The original solid earthbank Fratton End stand was replaced in 1956 with a new stand built from prefabricated concrete and steel. It had two distinctive terraced tiers, a roofed upper terrace and an open-air lower terrace. In the 1956–57 season, Portsmouth escaped relegation by four points and finished two places above the drop zone.

In the following 1957–58 season, Portsmouth once again escaped relegation on goal average and finished one place above the relegation zone. Manager Eddie Lever left Portsmouth in April 1958.

Freddie Cox became new Portsmouth manager in August 1958. The new 1958–59 season was the first Football League season with four national divisions. The two old regional Third Divisions (North and South) which had begun in the 1921–22 season were restructured and replaced with two new national divisions, named the Third Division and Fourth Division. At the end of the 1958–59 season Portsmouth finished bottom of the First Division, ending their 32-year stay in the First Division, and relegation to the Second Division. By now, the championship winning team of 1949 and 1950 had been broken up, caused by ageing or injury.

1959–1979: Decline and relegation to the Fourth Division
Following the bottom-place finish in the previous 1958–59 First Division season, Portsmouth started the 1959–60 season in the Second Division, the second tier of English football, which Portsmouth had last been in during the 1926–27 season. After another poor season, they escaped a further relegation to the Third Division only by 2 points and finishing only one place above the relegation zone.

In the 1960–61 season Portsmouth finished second-to-last place in the Second Division relegation zone and were relegated once again to the Third Division, (the first former English League champions to do so). Manager Freddie Cox was sacked in February 1961.

Under the guidance of George Smith, Portsmouth, now in the Third Division for the 1960–61 season had a good season and were promoted back to the Second Division at the first time of asking after winning the Third Division title. Field-Marshal Bernard 'Monty' Montgomery of Alamein, was the honorary President of Portsmouth, having begun to support them during World War II due to the proximity of his headquarters at Southwick House on the outskirts of Portsmouth. In private correspondence dated 25 April 1962, he wrote to Smith: "I congratulate you very much on getting Portsmouth out of the Third Division – which was completely a wrong place for a famous team. While the players all did their stuff, the major credit goes to you."

Despite limited financial means, manager George Smith maintained Portsmouth's Second Division status throughout the rest of the 1960s until Smith was replaced by Ron Tindall in April 1970 as Smith moved upstairs to become general manager in April 1970, until his retirement from football in 1973.

The cash injection that accompanied the arrival of John Deacon as chairman in 1972 failed to improve Portsmouth's Second Division position. Ron Tindall was replaced in May 1973 by John Mortimore. However, Ron Tindall returned for two games as caretaker manager after manager John Mortimore left in 1974. Ian St. John became new Portsmouth manager in September 1974.

With Deacon unable to continue bankrolling the club on the same scale, Portsmouth finished bottom of the Second Division in the 1975–76 season and were relegated down to the Third Division.

In November of the 1976–77 Third Division season, the club found itself needing to raise £25,000 to pay off debts and so avoid bankruptcy. With players having to be sold to ease the club's financial situation, and no money available for replacements, Portsmouth were forced to rely on inexperienced young players. Initially results improved, but then declined again. On 4 May 1977, Ian St. John was replaced as manager by former Portsmouth and England international player Jimmy Dickinson. They ended the 1976–77 season only one place and one point above the Third Division's relegation zone.
They were relegated at the end of the new 1977–78 season, finishing in bottom place.

In the 1978–79 Fourth Division season, Portsmouth finished in 7th position. Jimmy Dickinson suffered a heart attack near the end of the season and after the season in May 1979, was replaced by Frank Burrows.

1979–1987: Return to the First Division

Under Frank Burrows new management, Portsmouth gained promotion back to the Third Division after finishing in 4th place in the 1979–80 season. Portsmouth would take three seasons before in 1983, Portsmouth claimed their Third Division championship title, gaining promotion back into the Second Division.

In the 1983–84 Second Division season, Portsmouth finished sixteenth place in the table. After the season, Bobby Campbell was replaced by former England international and 1966 FIFA World Cup winner, Alan Ball on 11 May 1984.

Under Ball, Portsmouth's results markedly improved and they narrowly missed winning promotion to the First Division in the 1984–85 Second Division season, finishing in 4th place on goal difference. They finished in 4th place again for the following 1985–86 season.

In Ball's third season as Portsmouth manager in the 1986–87 Second Division season, Portsmouth finished as runners-up behind Derby County, gaining promotion back to the First Division for the first time since the 1958–59 season. During the season, the upper tier of the Fratton End stand, built only thirty years earlier in 1956, was closed due to structural concerns, leaving only the lower tier of the Fratton End open to fans.

By the middle of the new 1987–88 First Division season, the club was again in financial trouble. Portsmouth were relegated straight back down to the Second Division. The summer of 1988 saw chairman John Deacon sell the club to London-based businessman and former Queens Park Rangers chairman, Jim Gregory.  Fratton Park was in a poor condition, with the Fratton End still half closed to fans and leaking roofs in the North and South stands.

With new chairman Jim Gregory injecting money into the club, work began in the summer of 1988 to demolish the upper tier of the Fratton End and its roof. The North and South stands were refurbished and both received smart new blue-coloured metal sheet roofs.

1988–2003: The Second Tier

After a single disappointing season in the First Division, Portsmouth were relegated back to the Second Division for the 1988–89 season. Halfway through the season, Alan Ball was sacked on 17 January 1989 and replaced by John Gregory. The club's parent company had a name change from 'Portsmouth Football Company Limited' to 'Portsmouth Football Club Limited' on 23 January 1989. The entire Fratton End stand was closed during most of the season during demolition works, with only the lower tier of the stand reopening in the springtime of 1989. Portsmouth ended the season only two places above the relegation zone.

Following the 15 April 1989 Hillsborough Disaster, Portsmouth removed the perimeter fences from Fratton Park for the new 1989–90 season, except at the Milton End to separate away supporters. The season saw John Gregory leaving the club on 3 January 1990. Assistant manager Frank Burrows became manager for a second spell on 23 January 1990. Portsmouth finished in 12th position at the end of the season.

The 1990–91 season saw Frank Burrows resign as manager on 13 March 1991 after a string of bad results. Burrows was replaced by coach Graham Paddon until the end of the season, finishing in 17th position.

Jim Smith's arrival as manager at the start of the 1991–92 season sparked a revival in the team's fortunes and that year Portsmouth reached the semi-finals of the FA Cup, meeting Liverpool at neutral ground Highbury on 5 April 1992 – the 94th Anniversary of Portsmouth Football Club. Portsmouth took the lead in extra time from a 111th minute Darren Anderton goal. However, Liverpool's Ronnie Whelan equalised five minutes later, and the semi-final match ended tied 1–1 after the allotted 120 minutes. The tie was then replayed at Villa Park on 13 April 1992 and ended 0–0 after extra time.  Portsmouth then lost 1–3 on penalties to Liverpool, who went on to meet Sunderland in the 1992 FA Cup Final, which Liverpool won 2–0.

The 1992–93 Football League season saw a major restructuring of the English football "pyramid" system, caused by all the First Division clubs resigning from the Football League and forming a new breakaway top tier FA Premier League. Now without a First Division, the Football League Second Division was renamed as the "Football League First Division" for the 1992–93 season. The FA Premier League also had a new winners trophy made, meaning the famous old Football League First Division championship trophy became demoted in status, now acting as the new second tier "First Division" championship trophy instead. Portsmouth had a good 1992–93 season in the new "First Division", but missed out on automatic promotion to the new first tier Premier League by virtue of scoring only one fewer goal than second-placed West Ham United. In the subsequent promotion play-offs, Portsmouth lost 3–2 on aggregate over two games to Leicester City in the play-off semi-finals for the third promotion place.

During the 1993–94 season under manager Jim Smith, Portsmouth finished 17th out of 24 in the First Division, winning 15 matches, drawing 13 and losing 18. The team reached the quarterfinals of the League Cup and the third round of the FA Cup, in both cases being knocked out after replays.

The 1994–95 season was a disappointing one for Portsmouth and after a decline in form which left them struggling at the wrong end of the "new" First Division, Jim Smith was sacked on 1 February 1995 and was replaced by Terry Fenwick, who guided them to safety with 4 wins in their final 6 league games.

In the 1995–96 season Fenwick's first full season in charge of Portsmouth, relegation to the Second Division was avoided on the last day of the season (on goal difference) when Portsmouth won away at Huddersfield Town while other results went the club's way.

In the summer of 1996, Terry Venables arrived at Portsmouth as a consultant. Venables had recently resigned as the England national team manager after the UEFA Euro 1996 competition. Fratton Park was transformed into an all-seat stadium, with new blue plastic seats fitted to the lower North terrace, Milton End, lower South terrace paddocks and also to the remnant of the Fratton End terrace.

In the 1996–97 league campaign, Portsmouth finished just short of the qualifying places for the playoffs for promotion to the Premier League. Terry Venables took over as chairman in February 1997 after buying a 51 per cent controlling share in the club for £1. The team enjoyed a run in the 1996–97 FA Cup competition, beating FA Premier League side Leeds United on 15 February 1997, but were eventually beaten 1–4 by Chelsea F.C. in the quarter-finals at Fratton Park on 9 March 1997.

At the end of the 1996–97 season, the Fratton End was fully demolished in the summer (of 1997) and work began to build a new Fratton End stand. Additionally, a new roof extension was built over the lower tier of the North Stand and was completed before the new season started. These new additions to Fratton Park were partly funded by the Football Trust (now The Football Foundation).

At 4.59pm on Friday 31 October 1997, the new £2.2 million Fratton End was officially cleared for its opening, with one minute to spare before a 5 pm deadline. Problems with some misorientated Fratton End rooftop floodlights caused the Fratton End of the pitch to be "shrouded in gloom on Hallowe'en", according to the Sky Sports 3 TV commentator, causing some doubt that the live televised Division One game against Swindon Town would take place. Fortunately, the match referee, Paul Danson gave the go-ahead for the evening fixture. The game was won 0–1 by Swindon Town with an official Fratton Park attendance of only 8,707. As a mark of respect to the club's former player and manager, a memorial portrait of Jimmy Dickinson was incorporated into the seating of the new Fratton End stand, along with the club's crest. Terry Venables' role as coach of the Australian national team meant he was frequently absent from Portsmouth. Meanwhile, the team's results were poor. Two-thirds of the way through the 1997–98 season, he and manager Terry Fenwick left the club, with Portsmouth on the bottom of the table, and Venables selling his shareholding back to Martin Gregory, son of former chairman Jim Gregory. Alan Ball then returned as manager for the second time on 26 January 1998. Relegation to the third tier was avoided on the last day of the season – by 1 point.

Portsmouth's centenary season, 1998–99, saw a financial crisis hit the club, and in December 1998 Portsmouth went into financial administration. Serbian-born US businessman Milan Mandarić was persuaded by his friend George Best to invest in an English football club; Mandaric considered Manchester City at first, but decided to buy Portsmouth F.C. in May 1999. Milan Mandaric immediately started investing for Pompey's new 1999–2000 season.

Alan Ball was sacked on 9 December 1999 during the 1999–2000 season with the club near the bottom of the table. Tony Pulis took over on 13 January 2000 and steered the club to safety at the end of the season.

In the 2000–01 season, Pulis was put on leave and replaced by Portsmouth player, Steve Claridge in a player-manager role. On 23 February 2001, Graham Rix took over from Claridge. Portsmouth escaped relegation on the last day of the 2000–01 season when they won their final game and Huddersfield Town lost theirs, keeping Portsmouth up at their expense. During the summer break, former West Ham United manager Harry Redknapp was appointed director of football by Mandaric.

A week before the new season began, 25-year-old Portsmouth goalkeeper Aaron Flahavan was killed in a car crash near Bournemouth on 5 August 2001. In a mark of respect, Portsmouth retired his number 1 shirt for the season. Portsmouth signed veteran Croatian playmaker Robert Prosinečki on a one-year deal and Peter Crouch for the start of the 2001–02 season. Rix lost his job on 25 March 2002, with Harry Redknapp taking over. Former Portsmouth manager Jim Smith was asked to team up with Redknapp, and while he initially turned the offer down to remain as assistant at Coventry City, he soon arrived at Portsmouth after a change of manager at Coventry saw almost all of the club's coaching staff being dismissed. Peter Crouch scored 19 goals for Portsmouth, but was sold to Aston Villa in March 2002 for £5 million.  Portsmouth ended the 2001–02 Division One season in 17th place and 4 points above relegation.

In the 2002–03 season, Portsmouth led the First Division for most of the season, with Svetoslav Todorov scoring 26 league goals, which made him the First Division's top scorer at the end of the season. Portsmouth finished top as First Division champions on 27 April 2003, six points clear of second-placed Leicester City, gaining promotion (with a game to spare) to the FA Premier League, returning to the top tier of English football after an absence of fifteen seasons. Portsmouth were awarded the Football League First Division Championship trophy for a third time, as the former Football League championship trophy had been demoted in status in 1992–93 (because of the creation of the FA Premier League) and had become the second tier trophy. Portsmouth goalkeeper Shaka Hislop, midfielders Matthew Taylor and Paul Merson earned places in the 2002–03 Division One PFA Team of the Year award.

2003–2010: FA Premier League
In Portsmouth's Premiership debut season in 2003–04, the "Harry & Jim" partnership of Harry Redknapp and Jim Smith resulted in a 13th place final position at the end of the season.

Almost halfway through the following 2004–05 season in the Premiership, Harry Redknapp unexpectedly walked out on Portsmouth on 24 November 2004 after a row with chairman Milan Mandarić over the appointment of new Director of Football Velimir Zajec at the club. Shortly afterwards on 8 December 2004, Harry Redknapp was announced by Southampton F.C. chairman Rupert Lowe as their new manager, with Jim Smith as his assistant. Velimir Zajec then replaced Redknapp as Portsmouth manager, but in April 2005, Zajec was replaced by Frenchman Alain Perrin. Perrin managed to secure Portsmouth's Premiership status with a few games of the season left, including a South Coast Derby 4–1 win over Harry Redknapp's Southampton side, who were eventually relegated at the end of the season.

During the 2005–06 season and after achieving only four wins from a total of 20 games as Portsmouth manager, Alain Perrin was sacked on 24 November 2005, exactly one year to the day since Harry Redknapp left Portsmouth. Harry Redknapp then made a surprise return to manage Portsmouth again after leaving relegated Southampton. In January 2006, Portsmouth were sold by Milan Mandarić and bought by businessman Alexandre Gaydamak. New signings included a quartet from Tottenham Hotspur, then record signing Benjani and Argentine international Andrés D'Alessandro on loan from VfL Wolfsburg. The club survived their third season in the Premier League one place above the relegation zone in 17th position. With large amounts of money available for Redknapp to make record signings, the club finished the 2006–07 season in the top half of the table for the first time since their promotion, in ninth position, only one point short of European qualification.

The following 2007–08 season Portsmouth finished eighth in the Premier League and reached the FA Cup final for the first time since 1939. They eliminated Manchester United at Old Trafford in the quarter-finals, and on 5 April 2008, Portsmouth beat Championship side West Bromwich Albion 1–0 at Wembley Stadium in the semi-finals, coincidentally the same day that the club celebrated its 110th birthday. On 17 May 2008, Portsmouth played Cardiff City in the FA Cup Final at Wembley Stadium, the second such final at the newly rebuilt Wembley. Portsmouth won 1–0, with Nwankwo Kanu scoring the only goal. It was the second time Portsmouth had won the FA Cup.

The FA Cup win had also earned Portsmouth a place in the 2008–09 UEFA Cup, the club's first time playing European football. Their first European match was a 2–0 victory over Vitória de Guimarães in the first round on 18 September. Portsmouth went on to win the tie 4–2 on aggregate, progressing to the group stage. On 25 October 2008, Redknapp suddenly left Portsmouth for a second time, leaving his assistant Tony Adams to be promoted to the managerial role. On 27 November 2008, Portsmouth drew 2–2 with Milan, going 2–0 up through goals from Younès Kaboul and Nwankwo Kanu, but conceding two goals later in the game.  Adams was dismissed in February 2009. Youth team coach Paul Hart took over as manager until the end of the season, and Portsmouth were guaranteed Premier League safety on 16 May 2009. Portsmouth finished the 2008–09 Premier League season in 14th place. On 26 May, Portsmouth accepted a bid from Emirati businessman Sulaiman Al Fahim to purchase the club.

Because of the financial problems suffered by the club, Portsmouth were forced to sell several of their top players and high earners, including Peter Crouch, Sylvain Distin, Glen Johnson and Niko Kranjčar. On 21 July 2009, Al Fahim was appointed non-executive chairman of Portsmouth. On 19 August 2009, Portsmouth announced on their website that a rival consortium headed by current CEO Peter Storrie had also made a bid for the club; unknown at the time, this was backed by Ali al-Faraj. Despite this, Al Fahim completed the takeover on 26 August 2009; al Faraj moved to review a takeover of West Ham United.

As the early stages of the 2009–10 season progressed, the finances dried up and the club admitted on 1 October that some of their players and staff had not been paid. On 3 October, media outlets started to report that a deal was nearing completion for Ali al-Faraj to take control of the club. On 5 October, a deal was agreed for al-Faraj and his associates, via BVI-registered company Falcondrone, to hold a 90% majority holding, with Al-Fahim retaining 10% stake and the title of non-executive chairman for two years. Falcondrone also agreed a deal with Alexandre Gaydamak the right to buy, for £1, Miland Development (2004) Ltd., which owns various strategic pockets of land around the ground, once refinancing was complete. Two days after the al-Faraj takeover was completed, Portsmouth's former technical director Avram Grant returned as director of football. Because of the financial problems, however, the Premier League placed the club under a transfer embargo, meaning the club were not allowed to sign any players.

Avram Grant took over at Portsmouth on 26 November 2009, replacing Hart, who had been sacked by the board two days previously due to the club's position at the bottom of the league table.

In December 2009, it was announced that the club had failed to pay the players for the second consecutive month, and on the 31st it was announced player's wages would again be paid late, on 5 January 2010. According to common football contracts, the players then had the right to terminate their contracts and leave the club without any compensation for the club, upon giving two weeks' notice. Despite the financial difficulties, Grant's time as manager was initially successful. He gained two wins (against Burnley and Liverpool) and a draw away at Sunderland from his first five games. The only losses inflicted on Portsmouth in this period were by eventual double winners Chelsea and the previous season's champions, Manchester United. HM Revenue and Customs (HMRC) filed a winding-up petition against Portsmouth at the High Court of Justice in London on 23 December 2009. In March 2010, this winding-up petition was dropped, leaving Portsmouth with a nine-point penalty for entering administration.

Administration, 2010 FA Cup Final and relegation
During the 2009–10 season, it had become apparent to the club's new owner Balram Chainrai that Portsmouth were approximately £135 million in debt so to protect the club from liquidation, Chainrai placed the club into administration on 26 February 2010, and the club appointed Andrew Andronikou, Peter Kubik and Michael Kiely of accountancy firm UHY Hacker Young as administrators. This automatically incurred a nine-point penalty from the Premier League which came into effect on 17 March and consigned the team to almost certain relegation, which was mathematically confirmed on 10 April 2010. On 9 April 2010, it was announced David Lampitt would be joining Portsmouth as their new CEO after he had worked a period of notice at the FA, his current employer.

Portsmouth were relegated to the EFL Championship (the new Tier 2 level name) the following day on 10 April 2010 after West Ham won.  Portsmouth won their FA Cup semi-final match against Tottenham 2–0 after extra-time the next day, with goals from Frédéric Piquionne and Kevin-Prince Boateng winning the match. They faced Chelsea in the final at Wembley on 15 May 2010 and lost 1–0 to a goal from Didier Drogba. Despite being the FA Cup finalists, the club were denied a licence to play European football the following season in the UEFA Europa League. In May, Grant resigned as Portsmouth manager. On 17 June, the club's creditors voted for a company voluntary arrangement (CVA), with an 81.3% majority; HMRC, Paul Hart and the agent of Portsmouth midfielder Tommy Smith were the only ones to reject it, but HMRC appealed against the CVA due to the reduction of its considerable debt. On 15 July 2010, HMRC appealed against the proposed CVA on the last day before it would be formally agreed, the case was originally going to take place in October 2010, but after an appeal from the administrators at the club it was set for 3 August at the High Court in London. The case was heard by Mr Justice Mann from 3 to 5 August where, having heard submissions from both sides, he turned down HMRC's appeal on all five counts it had put forward. HMRC decided not to appeal against the verdict, leaving Portsmouth's administrators to formally agree the CVA and bring the club out of administration. On 17 August, Balram Chainrai completed his takeover of the club and passed the owners' and directors' fit and proper person test.

2010–2017: Decline and relegations to fourth tier
Former Notts County manager Steve Cotterill was appointed manager of relegated Portsmouth in the Championship June 2010 on a three-year contract. On 22 October, Portsmouth issued a statement saying, "It appears likely that the club will now be closed down and liquidated by the administrators," but key creditor Alexandre Gaydamak announced the next day that he had reached an agreement which could save their future. It was revealed just hours later that Portsmouth had finally come out of administration, with Balram Chainrai regaining control of the company. On 1 June 2011, Convers Sports Initiatives (CSI) owned by Russian Vladimir Antonov completed its takeover of the club.

On 14 October 2011, Steve Cotterill took the vacant Nottingham Forest manager's position. He was succeeded by Michael Appleton, who was announced as the new manager on 10 November 2011. On 23 November 2011, a Europe-wide arrest warrant was issued for Portsmouth owner Vladimir Antonov by Lithuanian prosecutors as part of an investigation into alleged asset stripping at Lithuanian bank Bankas Snoras, which was 68% owned by Antonov and had gone into temporary administration the previous week. Operations in another of Antonov's banks, Latvijas Krajbanka, were suspended by Latvian authorities for similar reasons. Antonov was subsequently arrested at his offices in London on 24 November and was bailed. He shortly afterwards resigned as chairman of Portsmouth after parent company CSI entered administration. On 24 January 2012, Portsmouth were issued with a winding up petition by HMRC for over £1.6 million in unpaid taxes, which was heard on 20 February. On 17 February 2012, Portsmouth went into administration for the second time in two years, bringing them an automatic 10-point deduction. Administrator Trevor Birch admitted that the financial situation was "worse than we first feared" and that Portsmouth were "struggling to make the end of the season". On 11 April 2012, reports from administrators PKF revealed that Portsmouth owed £58 million with £38 million being owed to UHY Hacker Young, £10.5 million investment made by Vladimir Antonov's CSI remained outstanding, players were due £3.5 million in wages and bonuses for the last two seasons, while £2.3 million was owed to HMRC and, additionally, £3.7 million was owed for general trade. On 21 April, Portsmouth were relegated from the Championship after a 2–1 loss to Derby County, the first time in 30 years that the club had played at that level.

Following Pompey's relegation to League One, the entire professional playing squad left the club. The team were given a 10-point deduction in December 2012 for their financial problems. On 7 November 2012, it was announced that Michael Appleton had left Portsmouth to become the manager of Blackpool. On 9 November 2012, Chanrai halted his attempt to buy the club. Six days later, the Pompey Supporters Trust signed a conditional agreement with PFK to buy the club. Portsmouth were unable to find a manager on a long-term basis due to their financial state. The club went on a record winless run of 23 matches, finally ending on 2 March 2013 as Portsmouth won 2–1 away at Crewe Alexandra. On 10 April 2013, a deal with administrators was reached, although the Pompey Supporters' Trust had not yet finalised the purchase. Portsmouth were relegated (for the second successive season) to League Two at the end of the season. On 19 April 2013, Portsmouth exited administration when the Pompey Supporters' Trust (PST) deal to buy the club was completed. Former caretaker Guy Whittingham was appointed manager on a permanent basis with a one-year contract. Portsmouth sold over 10,000 season tickets for the 2013–14 season, a record for any League Two club.

In November 2013, Whittingham was sacked and a month later ex-Crawley Town manager Richie Barker was appointed Portsmouth boss, along with Steve Coppell as the director of football. Barker was sacked after 20 games in charge, with the club in serious danger of relegation to the Football Conference, and Andy Awford was again made caretaker manager. He won five games out of five played, guaranteeing Pompey's survival in League Two. On 1 May 2014, Awford was appointed Pompey's permanent manager, signing a one-year contract.

On a historic announcement on 29 September 2014, the club was able to declare itself debt-free after paying back all creditors and legacy payments to ex-players. The news came 18 months after the PST took control of the club. Following an unsuccessful EFL League Two 2014–15 campaign, Paul Cook was appointed new manager of Portsmouth on 12 May 2015.

Paul Cook led Portsmouth to an EFL League Two play-off spot in the 2015–16 season after a 2–0 away win at Hartlepool United on 30 April 2016, but lost to Plymouth Argyle in the semi-final.

In the 2016–17 season, Paul Cook's side secured promotion to League One with a 3–1 win away at Notts County on 17 April 2017. On 6 May, the final match of the season, Portsmouth topped the table (for the first time in the season) following the 6–1 home win against Cheltenham and were crowned champions of League Two. Paul Cook resigned on 31 May 2017 to join Wigan Athletic. Kenny Jackett was appointed the new manager on Friday 2 June 2017. In May the Pompey Supporters' Trust (PST) voted in favour of a proposed bid by The Tornante Company, headed by former Disney chief executive Michael Eisner, to take over the club which was completed on 3 August 2017.

2017–present: EFL League One
Portsmouth began the 2017–18 season in League One, the third tier of professional English football following their League Two championship win in the previous 2016–17 season. On 15 March 2018, Portsmouth revealed a newly redesigned club crest, featuring a new nautical compass star and an "1898" date, added for the founding year of the football club. The new crest was introduced for the new 2018–19 season. Portsmouth ended the 2017–18 League One season in 8th position on 66 points, missing the play-off places by 5 points.

The 2018–19 EFL League One season began in August with a run of four consecutive league wins and their best league start since 1980–81. Portsmouth remained undefeated in the 2018–19 EFL League One campaign for eleven consecutive league matches and topped the League One table, before being defeated by Gillingham in the twelfth match. On 31 March 2019, Portsmouth met Sunderland in the 2019 EFL Trophy Final at Wembley Stadium. The match finished 1–1 after normal time, and 2–2 after 30 minutes of extra time. A penalty shootout followed, with Portsmouth winning 5–4. Portsmouth's regular EFL League One season concluded on 4 May 2019, with the team finishing 4th and qualifying for the League One play-offs. In the play-off semi-finals, Portsmouth were met by fifth placed Sunderland. The first leg match at the Stadium of Light on 11 May 2019 was won 1–0 by Sunderland. The second leg was played at Fratton Park on 16 May 2019 and ended 0–0, which meant Portsmouth lost 0–1 overall and missed a Wembley play-off final for promotion to The Championship.

During the 2019–20 season, Portsmouth achieved a winning run of nine consecutive matches in all competitions, setting a new win record for the club since Portsmouth joined the Football League in 1920. On 18 February 2020, Portsmouth qualified for the 2020 EFL Trophy Final after narrowly defeating Exeter City 3–2 in the semi-final at Fratton Park. Portsmouth were due to return to Wembley Stadium to defend the EFL Trophy as champions on 5 April 2020 – coincidentally, the 122nd anniversary of the founding of Portsmouth FC in 1898. Their opponents were to be Salford City, and would have been the first ever meeting between the two clubs. However, on 13 March 2020, all professional football in England was suspended until (at least) 30 April due to the global COVID-19 coronavirus pandemic. On 9 June 2020, the football clubs of EFL League One (and EFL League Two) voted to end the season early on a points-per-game calculation. Portsmouth were awarded a fifth place finish to earn one of the four promotion play-off places for the EFL Championship, and were matched with Oxford United in a two-legged semi-final behind closed doors. After two legs a penalty shoot-out was needed to settle the 2-2 aggregate tie, which Oxford United won 5–4.

Portsmouth's fourth-successive season in EFL League One in the 2020–21 season began on 12 September 2020, with a home fixture played at Fratton Park against Shrewsbury Town which ended 0–0 and was played behind closed doors.  COVID-19 'social-distancing' restrictions were partially relaxed in December 2020 when 2,000 Portsmouth fans were permitted to return to Fratton Park on 5 December for the EFL League One game against Peterborough United, a 2–0 win for the home side. Due to COVID-19 lockdowns, the delayed 2019–20 EFL Trophy Final was finally played behind closed doors at Wembley Stadium on 13 March 2021, with Portsmouth losing 4–2 on penalties to Salford City after ending 0–0 after extra time. After multiple consecutive losses and with only one win in seven games, manager Kenny Jackett was sacked on 14 March 2021, ending his almost 4 year tenure with the club. Jackett left Portsmouth in 7th place in the league, despite being top at Christmas, one place below the play-off positions. On 19 March 2021, the club appointed Danny Cowley as manager until the end of the 2020–21 season. By early May 2020 and with the full 46 league games played, Portsmouth narrowly missed out on the play-off places by finishing in eighth place - two points and two positions outside the promotion play-off places. On 10 May 2021, Danny Cowley and brother Nicky Cowley both signed "long-term" deals to remain at Portsmouth as manager and assistant respectively.

Portsmouth's fifth-successive season in EFL League One in the 2021-22 season began on 7 August 2021, with an away fixture at Fleetwood Town's Highbury Stadium, which resulted with a 0-1 win to Portsmouth. After winning their first three league games against Fleetwood Town, Crewe Alexandra and Shrewsbury Town, Portsmouth topped EFL League One on 17 August 2021. Then after a poor run of only two wins from fifteen games, Portsmouth fell into the bottom half of the table, but by Christmas 2021 had risen to eighth place, just outside the promotion play-off places. Portsmouth ended their 2021-22 season on 30 April 2022 in 10th position with a total of 73 points, missing out on the play-off positions by 10 points. During the 2021-22 season, a four-year plan to refurbish Fratton Park began, by replacing all of the North Stand's upper and lower tier seats. North Stand and South Stand refurbishment work was completed in late July 2022.

Portsmouth's sixth-successive season in EFL League One in the 2022–23 season began on Saturday 30 July 2022, with an away visit to Sheffield Wednesday's Hillsborough Stadium, which concluded with a 3-3 score draw. After an initial undefeated run of five EFL League One games (two draws, three wins), plus an away win in the first round of the EFL Cup at Cardiff City, Portsmouth's first loss of the 2022–23 season was in the second round of the EFL Cup at Newport County on 23 August 2022, ending both Portsmouth's participation in the EFL Cup and their overall undefeated run. After six undefeated league matches, Portsmouth topped the EFL League One table on 27 August 2022 after a 0-1 away win at Port Vale. Portsmouth's nine match undefeated run in League One ended on 1 October 2022 after a 3-2 away defeat at Ipswich Town. However, despite the promising start to the campaign, a dismal run of just one win in fourteen league games led to Portsmouth parting ways with manager Danny Cowley on 2 January 2023, with the club having dropped to 12th place.  On 3 January 2023, Portsmouth CEO Andrew Cullen stated on social media that first team coach Simon Bassey had taken interim charge of the team until a suitable replacement manager was found. Bassey departed the club on 20 January 2023 after Portsmouth announced the appointment of John Mousinho as head coach on a long-term contract. Mousinho's first game in charge resulted in a 2-0 home win against visitors Exeter City on Saturday 21 January 2023, their first EFL League One home win since 3 September 2022.  Three days later on Tuesday 24 January 2023, Portsmouth travelled to Fleetwood Town and defeated them 0-2, their first EFL League One away win since 22 October 2022. Jon Harley was appointed as assistant head coach on 16 February 2023.

Club identity

Club badge

Although Portsmouth F.C. were formed in 1898, the club did not have a club badge until one was introduced for the 1913–14 season. This would be the second season since Portsmouth's 1912 reformation, and their wearing of blue shirts for a second successive season. Their first season with a badge in 1913–14 would also become the last season before World War I began in 1914.

The official Coat of Arms of the City of Portsmouth contains an eight pointed gold star and crescent moon on a blue shield, Portsmouth's adoption of the star and crescent is said to have come from when King Richard I (1157–1189), who granted the city "a crescent of gold on a shade of azure, with a blazing star of eight points" which he had taken from the Byzantine Emperor's standard of Governor Isaac Komnenos, after capturing Cyprus.

The first 1913 Portsmouth F.C. badge was based on official symbols belonging to the town council of Portsmouth, which featured a golden eight-pointed star and a golden crescent moon.  The football club's first badge featured a horizontally elongated white crescent moon beneath a white five pointed star, with both symbols positioned in the centre of a blue four pointed shield. Portsmouth town council bestowed the privileged use (but not ownership) of their moon and star motifs to Portsmouth F.C., albeit with some colour and design changes.

Throughout their history Portsmouth F.C. have tried different variations of the badge before reverting to the basic gold star and crescent. After World War II, Portsmouth began using an eight-pointed star to match that used by the city of Portsmouth. In the 1950s and 1960s, the traditional badge was emblazoned on the shirt in white rather than gold but this was due to white being a cheaper alternative to a more expensive gold coloured thread.

Between 1980 and 1989, Portsmouth scrapped their traditional star and crescent badge and replaced it with an entirely new design. This badge showed a football in front of an anchor (representing the navy) and a sword (representing the army), with the whole design surrounded by an outer ring of ships rope. An alternative version included a circular version of the traditional star and crescent badge in place of the football.

During 1989 and 1993, the sword and anchor badge was dropped replaced with a simpler eight pointed star and crescent moon on a long narrow shield. At the foot of the shield, a blue banner featured "Portsmouth Football Club" written within it in capital letters.

From 1993 until 1997, the 1989–93 long narrow shield design was replaced by an embroidered badge of the city of Portsmouth Coat of Arms.

The 1993-97 city arms badge was replaced in 1997, with an eight pointed gold star and a golden crescent moon on a blue shield edged with a gold outer rim. At the foot of the shield, a gold ribbon with "Portsmouth F.C." written in blue gothic lettering completed the new design.  This new badge coincided with the rebuilding and reopening of the new Fratton End and the clubs centennial anniversary in the 1997–98 season

In 2007, an additional "Since 1898" was added to the 1997 badge ribbon underneath the shield in time for the 2007–08 season.

On 6 May 2008, a month after their 110th Anniversary, Portsmouth revealed a new badge with a very three dimensional look, the tradition curved shield with "three points" at the top of the shield were replaced with two straightened angles, with "Portsmouth F.C." written above the star on the shield. The traditional elongated crescent moon was replaced with a new circular one, which closely resembled that on the city's Coat of Arms. The new badge had its debut in the 2008 FA Cup Final, in which Portsmouth also wore a new 110th Anniversary all-blue commemorative home strip.

As part of the World War I Centennial Commemorations in the 2014–15 season, the club opted to temporarily replace the 2008 badge on the home kit with one almost identical to that used in 1913–14. This was a more traditional-looking club badge featuring the traditional three points at the top of a slightly rounded shield but with a silver five-pointed star inside instead of the usual eight-pointed one. The moon featured on the badge was also silver, both appearing on a blue background.

In June 2015, following positive feedback from supporters, Portsmouth F.C. decided to revert the official club badge back to a familiar and traditional design, over the one introduced in 2008, which was often criticised by Pompey fans for looking too similar to Arsenal F.C.'s updated modern era badge. Portsmouth's new 2015 badge was virtually identical in design to that which has been used for the majority of the club's history. The star and crescent, both silver-white on a blue background, had a slight three-dimensional appearance. The star was restored back to the familiar eight pointed design, instead of the five pointed version used in the 1913 and 2014 crests. The badge's shield retains the three points at the top but is in a more traditional shape. No lettering or numbering featured on the new badge, just like that which was used on home shirts the previous 2014–15 season.

On 4 May 2017 at Portsmouth Guildhall, The Tornante Company, owned by Michael Eisner met the Pompey Supporters Trust (PST), the fan-based owners of Portsmouth, to discuss a potential takeover of the football club. During the meeting, the prospective new owners identified a long overlooked ownership and copyright issue concerning the traditional Portsmouth badge – Portsmouth Football Club did not legally "own" the symbols on the badge, which had actually only been "on loan" to the club from Portsmouth City Council since 1913.

The Tornante Company completed their purchase of Portsmouth on 3 August 2017 after a majority vote from members of the Pompey Supporters Trust to sell. To rectify the copyright and commercial marketing issues with the current 2015 crest, the decision was taken by the new owners to design and copyright a brand new badge for the future. Portsmouth's fans were consulted by traditional and digital media during late 2017 and early 2018 with various designs for new badges. Most of the designs were minor tweaks and adjustments of the existing 2015 badge, just enough to make a new badge design different from that of Portsmouth City Council's coat of Arms.

On 15 March 2018, two newly redesigned club badges were finally revealed. Both new badges featured a new eight pointed nautical compass star and the addition of an "1898" date, the founding year of the football club, beneath the crescent moon. The new badges are to be copyrighted and introduced for the new 2018–19 season. The first new badge, similar to previous crests, is intended for players shirts. The second badge, surrounded by a blue ring with "Portsmouth Football Club" written in it, will be used for letterheads, merchandise and other commercial purposes.

Home colours

In their first 1899–1900 season in the Southern League Division One, Portsmouth's first home colours were salmon pink shirts with maroon collars and cuffs, matched with white shorts and black socks.  The pink shirts gave the early Portsmouth F.C. the alternative second nickname of 'The Shrimps'. The collars and cuffs were the same colour as the Corporation of Portsmouth's public trams, which were painted maroon at the time. These colours lasted until the end of the 1908–09 season. 'The Shrimps' nickname then also declined from common usage.

At the start of the 1909–10 season, Portsmouth changed to white shirts with navy blue shorts and navy blue socks. The next season, Portsmouth ended the poor 1910–11 season in bottom place and Portsmouth were relegated to Southern League Division Two. Following relegation, a financial crisis, fund raising, promotion in early 1912 and then another financial crisis, the original Portsmouth company that had been formed in 1898 was 'wound up'. A new limited company was formed on 27 July 1912 as Portsmouth F.C.'s parent company.

For the start of the 1912–13 Southern League Division One season, Portsmouth changed their home colours to azure blue shirts, white shorts and black socks. This was to become Portsmouth's home kit colour combination up until the start of the 1933–34 season, when the shirts were changed to a royal blue. These colours remained until the start of the 1947–48 season, when the black socks were changed to red; this coinciding with the club's most successful period and has remained the favoured colours for the majority of the time since. Portsmouth F.C. changed their colour combination several times during the 1966–1976 period, before reverting to the now tradition post-war blue shirts, white shorts and red stockings in 1976. For the club's 110th anniversary season in 2008–09, Portsmouth played in an all blue home kit, which debuted in the previous season's successful 2008 FA Cup Final win. Since the 2009–10 season, Portsmouth reverted to the now traditional blue-white-red home kit.

Red socks memorial

Portsmouth had predominantly worn black socks since their first match in 1899 up until the end of the post-World War II 1946–47 FA Cup season – in which the Football League had not yet resumed.

During the Second World War and post-war periods, the British Army's Field Marshal Sir Bernard 'Monty' Montgomery had been based at Southwick House, 5 miles to the north of Portsmouth. Montgomery regularly attended war-time League South matches at Fratton Park, becoming the honorary President of Portsmouth Football Club. Following the suggestion by Montgomery, red socks were introduced by the club as a memorial to soldiers lost in wartime as red is the traditional colour of the British Army and also the colour of the Remembrance poppy.

With the resumption of a full professional Football League season in England in 1947–48, Portsmouth changed their socks from the usual black to red at Christmas time in 1947. This also gave the Portsmouth team a patriotic blue, white and red appearance similar to the United Kingdom's red white and blue Union Flag.

The new red socks also coincided with Portsmouth's most successful period, as the club won two consecutive top-tier division (now 'Premier League') title honours in 1948–49 and 1949–50, so the red socks were retained for good luck.

Away colours
The most frequent away colours used by Portsmouth have been white shirts with royal or navy blue shorts and either blue or white socks.

Other historic kits

For the 2008 FA Cup Final victory against Cardiff City, Portsmouth debuted an all blue home kit manufactured by Canterbury and sponsored by Oki Printing Solutions to commemorate the club's 110th Anniversary year. The all blue home kit was also used throughout the following 2008–09 season.

Portsmouth again reached the FA Cup Final in 2010, but were defeated 1–0 by Chelsea. Portsmouth, as the away team, wore a white and maroon kit inspired from elements of the original "Shrimps" era (1899–1909) kit in which maroon collars and cuffs featured on the salmon pink home shirts.

Kit manufacturers and sponsors

1 Portsmouth's own manufacturer.
2 Nike extend kit deal for 2021–22, 2022–23, 2023–24 seasons.
3 University of Portsmouth extend sponsorship deal for 2021–22, 2022–23, 2023–24 seasons.

"Pompey" nickname
The traditional nickname of the Portsmouth Football Club is  Pompey, a nickname already long associated with the English city of Portsmouth and its Royal Navy base. An exact origin for the Pompey nickname has never formally been identified by historians, as many variations and interpretations of the Pompey nickname exist.

Ground

Portsmouth F.C. play their home games at Fratton Park, in the Portsmouth suburb of Milton. The football ground was formerly the site of a potato field in 1898 when it was purchased by the newly-formed Portsmouth Football & Athletic Company, formed on 5 April 1898, a consortium of local businessmen and ex British Army officers whose chairman was Sir John Brickwood, the owner of Brickwoods Brewery.

Fratton Park was designed and completed during 1899 by local architect Arthur Cogswell, and was first opened to the public on 15 August 1899, a public open day. The early Fratton Park of 1899 only had one roofed all-seat stand on the pitch's southern side, which measured 100 feet long and seven seat rows tall and was known as the Grandstand, the best (and only) seats in Fratton Park. Just in front of the Grandstand was a terraced standing enclosure. On the opposite northern side of the pitch, a 240 feet long uncovered North Terrace was built. The land behind the two goal line 'ends' was left informal and undeveloped at this time, although the entire pitch perimeter was encircled by a 4 feet high metal hoop-topped fence.

Portsmouth's first ever match was played away at Chatham Town on Saturday 2 September 1899, which Portsmouth won 1–0 and earned their first ever points in the Southern League Division One. The first ever football match to take place at Fratton Park was a "friendly" against Southampton, played four days later on Wednesday 6 September 1899, with Portsmouth winning 2–0. The first competitive match at Fratton Park was played three days later on Saturday 9 September 1899; a Southern League Division One match against Reading, which Portsmouth also won 2–0.

In 1900, Portsmouth's chairman, Sir John Brickwood opened a new Brickwoods Brewery public house named The Pompey next to Fratton Park on the corner of Frogmore Road and Carisbrooke Road in Milton, Portsmouth. The Pompey was designed by Arthur Cogswell, an architect who had a friendship with the club chairman and who had designed many of Brickwood's pubs in Portsmouth, as well as other buildings, including Fratton Park itself in 1900.

In 1905, an ambitious Portsmouth greatly expanded Fratton Park by the addition of a mock Tudor style club pavilion to the south-west corner in Frogmore Road, a pavilion designed by architect Arthur Cogswell. The pavilion originally featured  a tall octagonal clock tower spire on its north-east corner, with an upper viewing gallery built beneath it giving an unobscured view over the entire Fratton Park pitch. The pavilion contained the club offices and team changing rooms. In addition to the pavilion, two new solid earthbank terraces, topped with cinders and wooden planking were built behind the two goal ends. They were initially known as the Fratton Railway End and Milton End (or Spion Kop) and were built behind the west and east end goal lines respectively. The North Terrace was also partially redeveloped in 1905 with the addition of a second all-seat roofed stand similar in design to the original Grandstand, but built within the centre section of the North Terrace, which retained its original standing terraces to the new stand's sides.

During World War I, a roof was built over the Fratton Railway End in 1915.

After winning promotion to the Football League proper in 1920, the original southern side Grandstand was replaced in 1925 with a larger South Stand, designed by Scottish architect Archibald Leitch. The pavilion's clock tower was demolished as the South Stand was partially built into the pavilion's footprint and actually still contains most of the pavilion's original east side within it. The new South Stand was built with a seated upper tier while a lower section became a standing terrace, known as the South Paddock. The South Stand also contained new player's dressing rooms, which had access to the pitch via a player's tunnel built at paddock level at the halfway line point.

Ten years later in 1935, Archibald Leitch also designed a larger North Stand for Fratton Park, which saw a new full-length, roofed North Stand standing terrace built behind and overlooking a fully restored full-length lower Northern Terrace, which remained uncovered and open air. The west end section of the North Stand was built at an irregular angle compared to its east end, due to the confines of Fratton Park's land footprint, as an older public footpath named Milton Lane lay behind the stand and had been built at a different unparallel angle to the more recent Fratton Park. The new North Stand brought Fratton Park's maximum capacity up to 58,000 supporters, although this capacity was never quite filled to its maximum potential.

Fratton Park reached its current all-time ground attendance record of 51,385 supporters on 26 February 1949, for an FA Cup Sixth Round match, a 2–1 win against visitors Derby County.

In 1951, wooden seats were fitted to the North Stand's upper standing tier which slightly reduced overall ground capacity, while leaving the lower tier North Terrace open to standing supporters.

The Fratton Railway End was demolished in 1956 and replaced by a new prefabricated concrete and steel stand, simply known as The Fratton End, which omitted the "railway" part of the legacy name.

The pub building The Pompey was purchased by the football club in 1988 after its pub role ended, and has since been used as a club shop, club offices, a media centre, hospitality area and ticket office.

Fratton Park became an all seated football ground in 1996 when all terraces were fitted with blue plastic seats, which greatly reduced Fratton Park's previous maximum capacity.

In 1997, a new Fratton End was opened in October 1997, as the earlier 1956 one had been partially demolished in 1988 after its upper tier steel structure was found weakened by rust and was deemed unsafe. Also in 1997, the uncovered lower North Terrace was covered by a roof canopy which was joined to the existing North Stand roof.

In 2007, The Milton End finally received a roof for the first time, as many away visitors complained of being soaked by rain during its history.

Fratton Park is affectionately nicknamed "The Old Girl" by Portsmouth's supporters. The football ground has been home to the club throughout its entire history.

Plans for relocation were first mooted in the early 1990s, but due to various objections and financial obstacles, the club has continued to play at Fratton Park. Most recently, plans for relocation have included new stadia on a site offered by the Royal Navy at Horsea Island, between Stamshaw and Port Solent, and on reclaimed land in Portsmouth Harbour beside the existing naval base. The former was mooted as a possible 2018 FIFA World Cup venue as part of England's bid process. However, the cost to the city's taxpayers to join the bid was deemed too great a risk to take. A third, oft returned-to option, is to build a new stadium on the site of the existing Fratton Park.

Following Portsmouth F.C.'s financial troubles, subsequent relegation from the Premier League, and the failure of the England 2018 bid, as of May 2017 there are no active plans for a new club stadium.

Rivalries and supporters

Portsmouth's main rivals are Southampton, who are 19.8 miles (31.8 km) away. The South Coast Derby is one of the less frequently played rivalries within English football due to the clubs being in different divisions; however this usually adds to the ferocity of the fixture.

Prior to the mid/late 1960s, rivalry between Portsmouth and Southampton was largely non-existent, as a consequence of their disparity in league status. This derby match has been sporadic. Since 1977, the teams have only played league games against each other in four seasons (1987–88, 2003–04, 2004–05 and 2011–12). Including Southern League games, there have been 64 league games between the clubs, but they have also met five times in the FA Cup, Portsmouth beating their rivals 4–1 at St Mary's Stadium in their last meeting in 2010, and twice in the League Cup – with Southampton winning both times.

Many Portsmouth supporters commonly use the derogatory nickname Scummer (plural: Scummers) to describe Southampton fans, or collectively Scum to also include their football club, and indeed the city of Southampton itself.
 A disproven common origin theory dating from the late twentieth century suggested that the Scum nickname was an acronym of Southampton Company of Union Men, linked to a vague recollection of an unspecified and unsourced past dockers strike, in which Southampton-based dockers supposedly crossed Portsmouth dockyard picket lines when brought in as scab labour to work inside the naval base. This theory is almost certainly an urban myth, as Royal Navy dockers are not permitted to go on strike.
 Victorian era dockers employed in the supposedly higher status Portsmouth Royal Dockyard, looked down in disdain upon the civilian merchant port dockers at Southampton Docks and nicknamed them Scum, as scum, flotsam and jetsam are useless residue found floating on, or nearby water.
 According to the Oxford English Dictionary, Scummers was a derogatory name with naval origins for pirates or buccaneers, and was first recorded in use in 1585.

Meanwhile, Portsmouth supporters have had the equally derogatory nickname Skate bestowed upon them by Southampton fans as a rebuttal to Scummer since the 1987–88 Division One season. This was unofficially chosen by Southampton fans from a list of insults compiled by a Southampton-based supporters fanzine called The Ugly Inside in 1988. Ironically, the chosen nickname Skate was actually stolen from the civilian population of Portsmouth, who had long used Skate as a derogatory insult or nickname for sailors based in Portsmouth Dockyard and other Royal Navy establishments. According to legend and folklore, Royal Navy matelots on long sea voyages were regularly denied female company, and would keep a skate (fish species) in their hammock or bunkside, as the mouth of the skate was supposedly used as a substitute vagina. Sailors ashore in Royal Navy uniform seeking the services of Portsmouth's prostitutes would often be refused service and met with an "I ain't no skate bait, mate!" rebuttal.

Another rivalry over the years, colloquially known as the "Dockyard Derby", is with Plymouth Argyle. This rivalry is also known as the Battle of the Ports. In recent seasons the club has also developed a minor rivalry with Sunderland, mainly stemming from the clubs meeting each other 5 times in the 18/19 season.

'The Pompey Chimes'
The best-known chant sung by Portsmouth supporters are "The Pompey Chimes". The chant is regarded as football's oldest chant still in use today.

"The Pompey Chimes" were originally called "The Town Hall Chimes", and were created by the supporters of Royal Artillery (Portsmouth) Football Club, a British Army artillery regiment team, who were the most popular and successful amateur football team based in Portsmouth for much of the 1890s. Royal Artillery played their home matches at the United Services Recreation Ground in Burnaby Road, Portsmouth, and were already nicknamed "Pompey" before the founding of Portsmouth F.C. in 1898.

The nearby Portsmouth Town Hall, only 0.3 miles (0.5 km) from Burnaby Road was completed in 1890, and would strike the various Westminster Quarters chimes every quarter hour. Football referees would use the Town Hall's clock bells as a reference to when the football match should end at 4 pm. Just before 4 pm the crowd of supporters would sing in unison with the Town Hall's chimes on the hour to encourage the referee to blow the whistle to signify full-time. The original words to "The Pompey Chimes" (as printed in the 1900–01 Official Handbook of Portsmouth F.C.), were:

Play up Pompey,
Just one more goal! 
Make tracks! What ho!
Hallo! Hallo!!

With the demise of Royal Artillery (Portsmouth) F.C. after their expulsion from the 1898–99 FA Amateur Cup for alleged professionalism, many of Royal Artillery's supporters switched their allegiance in 1899 to Portsmouth F.C., taking the "Town Hall Chimes" chant and the "Pompey" nickname from Burnaby Road to Fratton Park, a distance of 1.8 miles (2.8 km).

The Pompey Chimes are still sung at Fratton Park today, and have evolved to be sung at a quicker tempo, and with a shortened chime style – usually twice:

Play up Pompey,
Pompey play up!
Play up Pompey,
Pompey play up!

It is most common to hear The Chimes sung by Portsmouth supporters as an encouragement to the Portsmouth team, more specifically before the Portsmouth players take set-piece kicks, such as corner-kicks, penalty-kicks or direct free-kicks.

Club records
 Home attendance record: 51,385 v Derby County, 1949 FA Cup Fifth Round, 26 February 1949, Fratton Park
 Away attendance record: 99,370 v Wolverhampton Wanderers, 1939 FA Cup Final, 29 April 1939, Wembley Stadium (1923)
 Current Wembley Stadium attendance record for a football match: 89,874 (90,000 capacity), 2008 FA Cup Final, 17 May 2008.
 Record victory: 9–1 v Notts County, Division 2, 9 April 1927
 Record defeat: 0–10 v Leicester City, Division 1, 20 October 1928
 Highest scoring game: 7–4 (11 goals) v Reading, Premier League, 29 September 2007
 Most consecutive wins (all competitions): 9 (4 January 2020 – 8 February 2020) 
 Most appearances for club: 834 Jimmy Dickinson, 1946–65
 Most league goals for club: 194 Peter Harris, 1946–1960
 Most league goals in a season: 42 Guy Whittingham, 1992/93
 Most goals for club: 211 Peter Harris, 1946–60
 Most international caps while at club: 48 Jimmy Dickinson (England)
 Transfer record (received): £18 million from Real Madrid for Lassana Diarra, December 2008
 Transfer record (paid): £11 million to Liverpool for Peter Crouch, July 2008

Portsmouth in Europe

To date Portsmouth have played a single season in UEFA competitions, competing in the 2008–09 UEFA Cup. They beat Vitória de Guimarães 4-2 on aggregate in the first round. In the group stage Portsmouth only registered one win along with a draw against A.C. Milan, and were knocked out at the group stages after a 3–2 away loss to VfL Wolfsburg.

Players
For a list of notable players and players who played for Portsmouth for more than 100 games in a sortable-list format, see List of Portsmouth F.C. players.

Current squad

Out on loan

Youth Academy

Retired and reserved numbers
 Number 1 was temporarily retired for the 2001–02 season in respect to goalkeeper Aaron Flahavan, who died in a car crash in August 2001, days after being handed the squad number 1 for the first time. Since the 2003–04 season, number 13 shirt was reserved in respect for him, as this was the number he wore for the majority of his stay at the club. Ten years after his death, however, the number 13 was again used, first by Stephen Henderson, then by Simon Eastwood, Johnny Ertl, James Bolton and Kieron Freeman respectively.
 Number 12 is reserved for the fans (often referred to as the 12th man).
 Number 58 is "Nelson" the club mascot's number.

Portsmouth Player of the Season (since 1968)
Source:

 1968 –  Ray Pointer
 1969 –  John Milkins
 1970 –  Nicky Jennings
 1971 –  David Munks
 1972 –  Richie Reynolds
 1973 – N/A
 1974 –  Paul Went
 1975 –  Mick Mellows
 1976 –  Paul Cahill
 1977 – N/A
 1978 – N/A
 1979 –  Peter Mellor
 1980 –  Joe Laidlaw
 1981 – N/A
 1982 –  Alan Knight
 1983 –  Alan Biley
 1984 –  Mark Hateley
 1985 –  Neil Webb
 1986 –  Noel Blake
 1987 –  Noel Blake

 1988 –  Barry Horne
 1989 –  Micky Quinn
 1990 –  Guy Whittingham
 1991 –  Martin Kuhl
 1992 –  Darren Anderton
 1993 –  Paul Walsh
 1994 –  Kit Symons
 1995 –  Alan Knight
 1996 –  Alan Knight
 1997 –  Lee Bradbury
 1998 –  Andy Awford
 1999 –  Steve Claridge
 2000 –  Steve Claridge
 2001 –  Scott Hiley
 2002 –  Peter Crouch
 2003 –  Linvoy Primus
 2004 –  Arjan de Zeeuw
 2005 –  Dejan Stefanović
 2006 –  Gary O'Neil
 2007 –  David James

 2008 –  David James
 2009 –  Glen Johnson
 2010 –  Jamie O'Hara
 2011 –  Hayden Mullins
 2012 –  Ricardo Rocha
 2013 –  Johannes Ertl
 2014 –  Ricky Holmes
 2015 –  Jed Wallace
 2016 –  Michael Doyle
 2017 –  Enda Stevens
 2018 –  Matt Clarke
 2019 –  Matt Clarke
 2020 –  Christian Burgess
 2021 –   Craig MacGillivray
 2022 –   Sean Raggett

Portsmouth Hall of Fame
Portsmouth created a Hall of Fame in March 2009, which honours former players and staff members of the club. At a year-by-year ceremony, the club holds a day to announce the year's inducted to the list, and also has a dinner for the people present.

The following players have been inducted into the Portsmouth Football Club Hall of Fame:

All appearances and goals according to Soccerbase. * Denotes player for Portsmouth FC Women

Key:

Women's team

The club's female counterpart is Portsmouth F.C. Women, which was founded in 1987. The team currently plays in the FA Women's Premier League National Division, after having won the FA Women's Premier League Southern Division in 2012. Pompey are the current holders of the Hampshire Cup. Following the takeover of Portsmouth F.C. by the Portsmouth Supporters Trust, it was announced that there would be closer ties between the men's and women's clubs.

Club management

Coaching positions
Source:

 Mark Catlin

 

|}

Managerial history

Ownership
Portsmouth Football Club has operated under five different parent company names in its history:
 Portsmouth Football and Athletic Company Limited (5 April 1898 – 27 July 1912)
 Portsmouth Football Club Limited (27 July 1912 – 12 May 1999) (initially as 'Portsmouth Football Company Limited' from 27 July 1912 until 23 January 1989 when name officially changed to 'Portsmouth Football Club Limited')
 Portsmouth City Football Club Limited (12 May 1999 – 25 May 2010) (initially as 'Overflint Limited' from 7 April 1999 – 12 May 1999)
 Portsmouth Football Club (2010) Limited (25 May 2010 – 10 April 2013) (initially as 'PFC Realisations Limited' from 25 May 2010 – 23 November 2010)
 Portsmouth Community Football Club Limited (10 April 2013 – Present) (initially as 'Portsmouth Supporters Trust (Operations) Limited' from 7 February 2012 – 14 September 2012)

The current owner of Portsmouth Community Football Club Limited is The Tornante Company, which purchased the club from the Portsmouth Supporters Trust (PST) on 3 August 2017.

Affiliated clubs
Portsmouth have had a long-standing relationship with Havant & Waterlooville, with regular pre-season friendlies organised between the two clubs. Portsmouth have also previously used West Leigh Park, Havant & Waterlooville's home stadium, for reserve team matches. Previous links with Belgian side Zulte Waregem and Irish academy Home Farm have been cancelled.

Portsmouth have developed a relationship with Gosport Borough after their promotion to the Conference South. Portsmouth fans were encouraged to support Gosport in their FA Trophy final match at Wembley in March 2014. They also play friendlies and loan out players to the side.

Honours and achievements
Source for honours:

League
Portsmouth are one of only five English football clubs to have been champions of all four tiers of the professional English football pyramid, (after Wolverhampton Wanderers, Burnley, Preston North End and Sheffield United). In addition, Portsmouth are also one of only two English football clubs to have been champions of five professional divisions including the former regional Football League Third Division South championship in the 1923–24 season. Wolverhampton Wanderers also share this distinction, having won all four divisions, plus a Football League Third Division North title win, coincidentally in the same 1923–24 season as Portsmouth won the respective South division.

First Division/Premier League (Tier 1)
 Champions (2): 1948–49, 1949–50

Second Division/EFL Championship (Tier 2)
 Champions (1): 2002–03
 Runners-up (2): 1926–27, 1986–87

Third Division/EFL League One (Tier 3)
 Champions (3): 1923–24 (South), 1961–62, 1982–83

Fourth Division/Third Division/EFL League Two (Tier 4)
 Champions (1): 2016–17

Southern Football League First Division
 Champions (2): 1901–02 (not elected for promotion), 1919–20 
 Runners-up (2): 1899–1900, 1906–1907

 Southern Football League Second Division
 Runners-up (1): 1911–12

 Western Football League First Division
 Champions (3): 1900–01, 1901–02, 1902–03

Cups
FA Cup
 Winners (2): 1938–39, 2007–08
 Runners-up (3): 1928–29, 1933–34, 2009–10

FA Community Shield
 Winners (1): 1949 (shared)
 Runners-up (1): 2008

EFL Trophy
 Winners (1): 2018–19
 Runners-up (1): 2019–20

Hampshire Senior Cup
 Winners (4): 1903, 1913, 1952, 1987
 Runners-up (4): 1900, 1904, 1905, 1959

References and notes

General references

Notes

Citations

 
1898 establishments in England
Association football clubs established in 1898
Companies that have entered administration in the United Kingdom
English Football League clubs
FA Cup winners
EFL Trophy winners
Football clubs in England
Football clubs in Hampshire
Premier League clubs
Southern Football League clubs
Sport in Portsmouth